Eye liner or eyeliner is a cosmetic used to define the eyes. It is applied around the contours of the eye(s). It is often used to create various aesthetic effects.

History

Eye liner was first used in ancient India, ancient Egypt and Mesopotamia as a dark black line around the eyes. As early as 10,000 BC, Egyptians and Mesopotamians wore various cosmetics including eye liner not only for aesthetics but to protect the skin from the desert sun.  Research has also speculated that eye liner was worn to protect the wearer from the evil eye. The characteristic of having heavily lined eyes has been frequently depicted in ancient Egyptian art. They produced eye liner with a variety of materials, including copper ore and antimony. Ancient Egyptian kohl contained galena, which was imported from nearby regions in the Land of Punt, Coptos and Western Asia.

In the 1960s, liquid eye liner was used to create thick black and white lines around the eyes in the make-up fashion associated with designers like Mary Quant. The '60s and '70s also saw new fashion trends which made use of eyeliner, eyeshadow and mascara in new ways. As goth and punk fashion developed, they employed eyeliner for a dark and dramatic effect.

Modern usage

In the late twentieth and early twenty-first century, heavy eye liner use has been associated with Goth fashion and Punk fashion. Eye liner of varying degrees of thickness has also become associated with the emo subculture and various alternative lifestyles. Guy liner is also a special style the emo subculture tend to use after being popularized from Pete Wentz, bassist of the pop-punk band Fall Out Boy.

Eye liner is commonly used in a daily make-up routine to define the eye or create the look of a wider or smaller eye. Eye liner can be used as a tool to create various looks as well as highlighting different features of the eyes.  Eye liner can be placed in various parts of the eye to create different looks with a winged eye liner or tight lined at the waterline. Eye liner can be drawn above upper lashes or below lower lashes or both, even on the water lines of the eyes. Its primary purpose is to make the lashes look lush, but it also draws attention to the eye and can enhance or even change the eye's shape. Eye liner is available in a wide range of hues, from the common black, brown and grey to more adventurous shades such as bright primary colors, pastels, frosty silvers and golds, white and even glitter-flecked colors.

Winged eye liner

Winged eye liner defines the shape of the top eyelid and extends to a point or ‘wing’ about halfway toward the end of the eyebrow.

Cat Eye 
A cat eye looks similar to a winged liner. But, it has a thicker wing that involves the bottom and the top lash line.

Tight lining
Tight lining is the use of eye liner tight against the waterline under the lashes of the upper lid, and above the lashes of the lower lid. Due to the proximity to the membranes, and the surface of the eye itself, waterproof eye liner is preferred. Tight lining is a technique which makes the eyelashes appear to start farther back on the eyelid, thus making them look longer. Gel eye liner and a small angled brush may be used to create this look.

Application
Advice on application varies. Harper's Bazaar recommends applying line in short strokes.

Types

Depending on its texture, eye liner can be softly smudged or clearly defined. There are six main types of eye liner available on the market: each produces a different effect.

Liquid eye liner is an opaque liquid that usually comes in a small bottle and is typically applied with a small sharp-tipped brush. It creates a clean, precise line. This type of eye liner is best used to create sharp, winged eyeliner. Because liquid eye liner gives a much heavier appearance, it is often only applied to the upper lash-line.
Powder-based eye pencil is eye liner in a wood pencil.  It is generally available in dark, matted shades.
Wax-based eye pencils are softer pencils and contain waxes that ease application. They come in a wide variety of intense colours as well as paler shades such as white or beige. Wax-based eye liners can also come in a cone or a compact with brush applicator. These are the cheapest and most ubiquitous eyeliner form
Kohl eye liner is a soft powder available in dark matte shades.  It is most often used in black to outline the eyes.  It comes in pencil, pressed powder, or loose powder form.  This type of eye liner is easy to smudge.
 Gel eye liner, which is a softer gel liner, that can be easily applied with an eye liner brush.  It can be precisely applied and is much softer than Kohl.
 Shimmer Liner, which is available in different bright colors applied on the upper as well as lower eyelid.

Chemical composition
Traditional wax-based eye liners are made from about 20 components.  About 50% by weight are waxes (e.g., Japan wax, fats, or related soft materials that easily glide on to the skin. Stearyl heptanoate is found in most cosmetic eyeliner. Typical pigments include black iron oxides, as well as smaller amounts of titanium dioxide and Prussian blue.

See also
Eye shadow

References

Cosmetics
Eyes in culture